Daniel Kosek (born 19 May 2001) is a Czech football player, who currently plays as a left back for Zbrojovka Brno on loan from Slavia Praha.

External links
 Profile at FC Zbrojovka Brno
 

2001 births
Living people
Czech footballers
FC Zbrojovka Brno players
Association football midfielders
Czech National Football League players
Sportspeople from Pardubice
SK Slavia Prague players
FC Slovan Liberec players
Bohemians 1905 players
Czech Republic youth international footballers